Belyanka (Bilän) is a rural locality (a selo) and the administrative centre of Belyankovsky Selsoviet, Belokataysky District, Bashkortostan, Russia. The population was 853 as of 2010. There are 10 streets.

Geography 
Belyanka is located 48 km northeast of Novobelokatay (the district's administrative centre) by road. Kayupovo is the nearest rural locality.

References 

Rural localities in Belokataysky District